Gualeguaychú Airport  is an airport serving Gualeguaychú, a city in the Entre Ríos Province of Argentina.

The Gualeguaychu VOR-DME (Ident: GUA) is located on the field.

See also

List of airports in Argentina
Transport in Argentina

References

External links
OpenStreetMap - Gualeguaychú Airport

FallingRain - Gualeguaychu Airport

Airports in Argentina
Gualeguaychú, Entre Ríos